Chen Da (1892–1975) was a Chinese sociologist.

Biography
Chen was born in Yuyao, Zhejiang Province and his sobriquet was Tongfu (通夫). From 1912-1916, he studied at Tsinghua School in Beijing. From 1916 to 1923, he studied in the United States, and obtained his doctorate degree from Columbia University. Upon graduation, he returned to China and taught at Tsinghua for many years. When Tsinghua School transformed into Tsinghua University in 1929, Chen helped found the department of sociology and became a professor and the chair of the department. During Sino-Japanese War, he moved south with the university to Kunming and became the chairman of department of sociology of Southwest Associated University, and the director of the institute of national information search at Tsinghua University. 

After 1952, Chen served as professor at Central Institute of Finance and Economics, Renmin University of China, and Labor Cadre College of Central Ministry of Labor. He died on January 16, 1975.

Chen excelled in teaching and studies of demographic problems and Chinese labor's problems. He emphasized on means of investigation and was one of pioneers of modern China's demography. Among his works, there are Overseas Chinese-A special investigation of working conditions (English version), Chinese Labor's Research, Demographic Research, Chinese in Southeast Asian and the Societies in Fujian and Guangdong, Overseas Chinese's Hometowns in South China (English version), and Demography in Modern China (English version).

1892 births
1975 deaths
Chinese sociologists
Tsinghua University alumni
Scientists from Ningbo
Academic staff of the Central University of Finance and Economics
Academic staff of Renmin University of China
Educators from Ningbo
Academic staff of the National Southwestern Associated University
Columbia University alumni